Swapnalokum is a 1983 Indian Malayalam film, directed and produced by John Peters. The film stars Shanthi Krishna, Sreenath, Jagathy Sreekumar and Shubha in the lead roles. The film has musical score by Jerry Amaldev.

Cast
Shanthi Krishna
Sreenath
Jagathy Sreekumar
Shubha
Prathapachandran
Sathaar
Augustine
Santhakumari

Soundtrack
The music was composed by Jerry Amaldev and the lyrics were written by O. N. V. Kurup.

References

External links
 

1983 films
1980s Malayalam-language films
Films scored by Jerry Amaldev